The Bellingrath House is a historic house at 7520 Dollarway Road in White Hall, Arkansas. It is a large -story masonry structure, built out of brick, stone, and half-timbered stucco in the Tudor Revival style. Its basically rectangular form is augmented by rectangular projecting sections and gabled elements of varying sizes. It has four chimneys, some brick and some fieldstone, and windows in a variety of configurations and sizes. One of the most notable features of the house is a massive fireplace built of rubble stone at the southern end of the house.

The house was commissioned by Ferd Bellingrath, owner of a local Coca-Cola bottling company, and is one of the community's most architecturally sophisticated houses. It was designed by local architect Mitchell Seligam in 1932, and completed in 1935.

The house was listed on the National Register of Historic Places in 1994.

See also
National Register of Historic Places listings in Jefferson County, Arkansas

References

Houses completed in 1932
Houses in Jefferson County, Arkansas
Houses on the National Register of Historic Places in Arkansas
National Register of Historic Places in Jefferson County, Arkansas
Tudor Revival architecture in the United States
White Hall, Arkansas